In the Government of Australia, the Minister for Defence Personnel is a position which is currently held by Matt Keogh, after the Albanese ministry was sworn in on 1 June 2022, following the 2022 Australian federal election.

The ministerial portfolio has existed under various names since 1987. The Minister appointed is responsible for oversight of defence personnel and administered the portfolio through the Department of Defence, the Australian Defence Force, the Australian Defence Force Academy, and a range of other agencies.

While ultimately responsible to the Commonwealth of Australia and the Parliament, in practical terms, the minister reports to the Minister for Defence.

List of Ministers for Defence Personnel
The following individuals have been appointed as Minister for Defence Personnel, or any of its precedent titles:

See also

 Department of Defence
 Minister for Defence
 Minister for Defence Industry
 Minister for Veterans' Affairs

Notes
a  Minister Mal Brough temporarily stood aside on 29 December 2015. Subsequently, Senator Marise Payne served as Acting Minister for Defence Materiel and Science. Brough later resigned from the Ministry on 13 February 2016 and Payne remained acting in the role until the rearranged ministry was sworn on 18 February 2016.

References

External links
 

Defence Personnel